During the 2006–07 English football season, Bristol City F.C. competed in the League One

Final league table

Results

Legend

Football League One

FA Cup

League Cup

Football League Trophy

Squad statistics

References 

Bristol City F.C. seasons
Bristol City F.C.